Marie Julia Berta Emma Kundt (4 February 1870 – 2 April 1932) was a German photographer and educator. From 1913 to 1932, she was the director of the photography department of Lette-Verein, an educational establishment for young women, where she broke new ground in supporting the development of courses for women wishing to become medical assistants.

References

1870 births
1932 deaths
People from Neustrelitz
Photographers from Mecklenburg-Western Pomerania
German women photographers
20th-century German educators
20th-century German women